This is a bibliography of the City of Gloucester in the south-west of England. The city lies close to the Welsh border, on the River Severn, between the Cotswolds to the east and the Forest of Dean to the southwest. It was founded  by the Romans under Emperor Nerva as Colonia Glevum Nervensis, and was granted its first charter in 1155 by King Henry II.

This bibliography includes non-fiction works covering the history of the city from Roman times, its archaeology, ecclesiastical history, general history, economy, and the transport and aviation sectors. It includes works covering the county of Gloucestershire where those include significant content relating to the city.

Printed bibliographies of Gloucester include Francis Hyett and William Bazeley's The Bibliographer's Manual of Gloucestershire Literature, published in five volumes in 1846 by John Bellows of Gloucester and with later supplements.

General history
 Atkyns, Robert. (1712) The Ancient and Present State of Glostershire. London.
 Bigland, Ralph. (1989-1995) Historical, Monumental, and Genealogical Collections relative to the County of Gloucester. 4 vols. Bristol: Bristol and Gloucestershire Archaeological Society. (originally published in instalments from 1791)
 Counsel, George Worrall. (1829) The History and Description of the City of Gloucester, From the Earliest Period to the Present Time, &c. Gloucester: J. Bulgin.
 Fosbroke, Thomas Dudley. (1819) An Original History of the City of Gloucester &c. London: John Nichols.
 Fullbrook-Leggatt, L. E. W. O. (1952) Anglo-Saxon and Medieval Gloucester. Gloucester: Jennings.
 Heighway, Carolyn. (1985) Gloucester: A History and Guide. Gloucester: Alan Sutton Publishing. 
 Gray, Irvine. (1981) Antiquaries of Gloucestershire and Bristol. Bristol: Bristol and Gloucestershire Archaeological Society. 
 Herbert N. M. et al. (1983) The 1483 Gloucester Charter in History. Gloucester: Alan Sutton.  (Translation of the charter and four lectures)
 — Ed.) (1988) A History of the County of Gloucester: Volume 4, the City of Gloucester. London. (The Victoria County History)
 Hyett, Francis. (1906) Gloucester in National History. Gloucester: John Bellows, London: Kegan Paul & Co.
 Lysons, Samuel. (1803) A Collection of Gloucestershire Antiquities
 Rudder, Samuel. (1779) A New History of Gloucestershire. Cirencester.
 — (1781) The History and Antiquities of Gloucester.
 Rudge, Thomas. (1803) The History of the County of Gloucester, Compressed and Brought Down to the Year 1803, 2 vols., Gloucester. 
 — (1807) A General View of the Agriculture of the County of Gloucester. 
 — (1811) The History and Antiquities of Gloucester, From the Earliest Period to the Present Time: &c.
 Smith, Roger. (2019) A-Z of Gloucester: Places-People-History. Stroud: Amberley. 
 Washbourne, J. (1825) Bibliotheca Gloucestrensis: A collection of scarce and curious tracts relating to the county and city of Gloucester. Gloucester.
 Waters, G. (1983) King Richard's Gloucester

Illustrated
 Amphlett, D. G. (2015) Gloucester: History You Can See. The History Press. 
 Elder, David. (2018) Historic England: Gloucester: Unique Images from the Archives of Historic England. Historic England series. Stroud: Amberley. 
 Kirby, Darrel. (2012) Gloucester Then and Now. Stroud: The History Press. 
 Jordan, Christine. (2015) Secret Gloucester. Amberley. 
 — (2016) Gloucester in 50 Buildings. Amberley. 
 Jurica, John. (1994) Gloucester: A Pictorial History. Chichester: Phillimore. 
 Moss, Philip. (2005) Historic Gloucester: An Illustrated Guide: An Illustrated Guide to the City and Its Buildings. Nonsuch Publishing. 
 — & Derrick Hall. (2016) Gloucester From Old Photographs. Amberley. 
 Sillence, Rebecca. (2009) Gloucester Through Time. Stroud: Amberley. 
 Voyce, Jill. (1985) Gloucester in Old Photographs from the County Library Collection. Gloucester: Alan Sutton. 
 — (1989) Gloucester in Old Photographs from the Walwin Collection. Gloucester: Alan Sutton.

Archaeology
 Glevensis (1966 to date) Journal of the Gloucester and District Archaeological Research Group
 Hurst, H. "Gloucester Castle" in TBGAS, Vol. 102, pp. 73–128.
 — (1985) Kingsholm. (Gloucester Archaeological Reports, 1.) Gloucester: Gloucester Archaeological Publications.

Architecture
 Clarke, John Randall. (c. 1850) The Architectural History of Gloucester: From the earliest period to the close of the eighteenth century.. Gloucester: T.R. Davies.
 Verey, David & Alan Brooks (2002) The Buildings of England Gloucestershire 2: The Vale and the Forest of Dean. New Haven & London: Yale University Press. 3rd edition. 

Areas
 Bullock, Donald. (2012) The Legend That Was Clapham: All Good Things... 2nd edition. Gloucester: Wheatley Press. 
 Eley, Harold. (1996) Clapham Tales: A Boyhood Account of Life in Clapham, Gloucester, During the 1930s and 1940s. Pickton Press. 

Biographical
 Firth, Brian. (1972) Twelve Portraits of Gloucester Benefactors: On view at Bishop Hooper's Lodging. Gloucester: City Museums and Art Gallery. 
 Gray, Irvine. (1981) Antiquaries of Gloucestershire and Bristol. Bristol: Bristol and Gloucestershire Archaeological Society. 
 Ripley, Peter, & John Jurica (Ed.) (1991) A Calendar of the Registers of the Freemen of the City of Gloucester 1641-1838. Bristol and Gloucestershire Archaeological Society. 
 Stratford, Joseph. (1887) Gloucestershire Biographical Notes. Gloucester: Gloucester Journal.

Crime
 Anon. (1792) Gloucester Bastile!!! Pathetic particulars of a poor boy sentenced to suffer seven years solitary confinement in Gloucester Gaol, etc. London: W. Holland.
 Evans, Jill. (2011) Hanged at Gloucester. The History Press. 
 —  A History of Gloucester Prison, 1791-1950. Newent: Glos Crime History Books. 
 Whiting, J. R. S. (1975) Prison Reform in Gloucestershire, 1776-1820: A Study of the Work of Sir George Onesiphorus Paul, Bart. Phillimore. 

Economy
 Ripley, P. (1976) "Trade and Social Structure of Gloucester, 1600-1640" in TBGAS, Vol. 94, pp. 117-123.
 —  "The Economy of the City of Gloucester, 1660-1740" in TBGAS, Vol. 98, pp. 135-154.

Gloucester Docks
 Conway-Jones, Hugh. (1984) Gloucester Docks: An illustrated history. Sutton & Gloucestershire County Library. 
 — (1988) A Guide to Gloucester Docks. Sutton. 
 Stimpson, Michael. (1980) The History of Gloucester Docks and its Associated Canals and Railways. Potters Bar: West London Industrial Archaeological Society. 

Ecclesiastical
 Britton, John. (1829) The History and Antiquities of the Abbey, and Cathedral Church of Gloucester &c. London: Longman.
 Bryant, R. (1980) "The Church of St. Mary de Lode, Gloucester", Glevensis, Vol. 14, pp. 4-12.
 Heighway, Carolyn M. & Susan Hamilton (2011) Gloucester Cathedral – Faith, Art and Architecture: 1000 Years. Scala Books. 
 Maddison, Lowinger. (2000) Gloucester Cathedral. The History Press. 
 Page, William. (Ed.) (1907) A History of the County of Gloucester: Volume 2. London. (The Victoria County History) - covers the religious houses of Gloucestershire and the early history of Gloucester Cathedral.
 Welander, David. (1985) The Stained Glass of Gloucester Cathedral.
 - (1991) The History, Art, and Architecture of Gloucester Cathedral. Alan Sutton Publishing. 

English Civil War
 Atkin, Malcolm, & Wayne Laughlin. (1992) Gloucester and the Civil War: A city under siege. Alan Sutton.  
 Day, John. (2007) Gloucester & Newbury 1643: The Turning Point of the Civil War. Pen and Sword. 
 Pereira, W. D. (1983) The Siege of Gloucester. Gloucester: Stoate and Bishop. 
 Whiting, J. R. S. (1975) Gloucester Besieged: The story of a roundhead city 1640-1660. Gloucester: City Museum & Art Gallery. (2nd edition 1984)

Entertainment and sport
 King, Malc. (2016) Kingsholm: Castle Grim, Home of Gloucester Rugby, The Official History. HobNob Press. 
 Kirby, Darrel. (2010) The Story of Gloucester's Pubs. Stroud: The History Press. 
 Sandles, Geoff. (2013) Gloucester, Tewkesbury & Severn Vale pubs through time. Stroud: Amberley. 

Politics
 Hyett, F. A. & C. Wells (1929) "Members of Parliament for Gloucestershire and Bristol, 1900-29", Transactions of the Bristol and Gloucestershire Archaeological Society, Vol. 51, pp. 321-362.
Stevenson W. H. (1893) Calendar of the Records of the Corporation of Gloucester. Gloucester: John Bellows.

Roman Gloucester
 Copeland, Tim. (2011) Roman Gloucestershire. History Publishing Group. 
 Fullbrook-Leggatt, L. E. W. O. (1946) Roman Gloucester-Glevum. Gloucester: John Bellows. (Revised edition 1968)
 Hurst, H. R. (1986) Gloucester: The Roman and later defences. Gloucester Archaeological Publications.  
 McWhirr, Alan. (1981) Roman Gloucestershire. Sutton Publishing. 

Transport and aviation
 A History of the Gloucester Railway Carriage & Wagon Co. Weidenfeld and Nicolson, 1960.
 Bartlett, Steve. (2019) Gloucester Locomotive Sheds: Horton Road & Barnwood: Engine and Train Workings. Pen & Sword. 
 James, Derek N. (1999) Gloster Aircraft Company. Stroud: Tempus.

Journals
 Gloucestershire Notes and Queries (1879-1902)
 Transactions of the Bristol & Gloucestershire Archaeological Society (1876 to date)

Maps
 Lobel, M. D. (Ed.) (1969) "Gloucester" in Historic Towns Atlas'', Vol. I. London & Oxford: Lovell Johns-Cook, Hammond & Kell.

References

History of Gloucester
History of Gloucestershire
Bibliographies of places